Pebmarsh is a small village and a civil parish in the Braintree District, in Essex, England.  It is situated to the north east of Halstead close to the A131.  The population of the village is included in the civil parish of Twinstead.

Sir Ronald Storrs, an official in the British Foreign and Colonial Office, Governor of Jerusalem, and a colleague of Lawrence of Arabia, is buried in the village churchyard.

A plaque on the church indicates the settlement of Pebmarsh was recorded, in some form, in the Domesday Book of 1086.

Amenities
It has a small village school, St. John the Baptist C of E primary school. There has been a school in Pebmarsh since the late 18th century, however the main part of the present school has been open and in operation since 1967, serving the surrounding villages of Pebmarsh, Lamarsh and Alphamstone. Pebmarsh has a large village hall which was built fairly recently to replace its run-down predecessor. There is a children's park in the vicinity, as well as a small skate park with three ramps.

The pub in the village, The King's Head, is community-owned and operated by a tenant landlord. £350,000 was raised from over 320 local shareholders after the previous owners retired. This was in response to the pub, the social centre of the village, not remaining open for more than a few years at a time.

Walking
Pebmarsh provides ample opportunity for walking through the beautiful English countryside. There are many public footpaths, for example one that leads to another village close by, Colne Engaine.

River
A river runs straight through the centre of the village, called the River Peb, and is where the name of the village 'Pebmarsh' comes from.

References

External links 

Pebmarsh.com

Villages in Essex
Braintree District